George A. Johnson (February 14, 1898 – February 19, 1961) was an American voice actor, who is best known for voicing Goofy in No Sail.

Filmography
No Sail (1945) - Goofy
Rawhide (1960) - Sam

References

External links

American male voice actors
20th-century American male actors
1898 births
1961 deaths
American male film actors
Male actors from California
People from Woodland Hills, Los Angeles